Miss Sierra Leone is a national Beauty pageant in Sierra Leone. The pageant constantly recruits the official winner to Miss World. In under Miss Sierra Leone Ltd. the pageant is sponsored by the government of Sierra Leone in Freetown.

International winners
Miss Africa:
1990 - Sia Matturi

Titleholders 
 
The Winner of Miss Sierra Leone represents her country at Miss World pageant. On occasion, when the winner does not qualify (due to age) for either contest, a runner-up is sent. In 1986, Alice Matta Fefegula was the first Miss World contestant to represent Sierra Leone. In 1990, Sia Matturi became the first University student to win the title, and though she did not compete that year in Miss World, she became the first titleholder to win an international title by winning Miss Africa 1990 in Banjul, The Gambia.

References

External links
 Miss World official website 

Sierra Leone
Recurring events established in 1986
1996 establishments in Sierra Leone
Beauty pageants in Sierra Leone
Sierra Leonean awards